FC Tsement Mikhaylovka is a Russian football team from Mikhaylovka. It played professionally from 1995 to 1997. Their best result was 12th place in Zone 2 of the Russian Third League in 1997.

Team name history
 1995–1996 FC Dynamo Mikhaylovka
 1997 FC Rotor-2 Mikhaylovka
 1998 FC Spartak Mikhaylovka
 2005–present FC Tsement Mikhaylovka

External links
  Team history at KLISF

Association football clubs established in 1995
Football clubs in Russia
Sport in Volgograd Oblast
1995 establishments in Russia